The Holdfast Bay Handicap, more commonly known simply as the HBH, is a popular handicapped road running event held annually in Adelaide, Australia.

The annual 7.55 km race attracts many participants from all over the world. The course starts at Marino and finishes at Glenelg. The race was first held in 2003 and has the potential to become the largest running race in Adelaide. The race held in 2017 took place on 15 December 2017, and was won by Patric Clarke and Ingrid Tejada of Adelaide.

The men's course record is, 26.26, held by Kieran Graham. The women's course record is, 32.22, held by Sinaed Noonan.

The HBH has spawned several lead up events such as the Cove Cup (since 2011) and Royal Somerton.

References

External links
Official website

Road running competitions
Sport in Adelaide
2003 establishments in Australia
Recurring sporting events established in 2003
Annual sporting events in Australia